Bradley Jones also known as Brad (born 2 April 1960) is a retired Australian racing driver. Jones now acts as team co-principal with his brother Kim in the V8 Supercar racing team, Brad Jones Racing.

Although he is more known as a V8 team owner, Brad Jones was successful in nearly all forms of motorsport he competed in. He is one of only two people alongside Jim Richards to have won both the Australian AUSCAR and NASCAR championships.

Motorsport career
Jones was born and grew up in the country town of Albury in New South Wales, where he still lives now. He has a range of experience in domestic and international racing that he puts to use in the V8 Supercar team he owns and runs with his brother Kim. Jones has driven with a number of manufacturers including Ford, Holden, Lotus, Volkswagen, Mercedes-Benz, Audi and Mitsubishi at domestic and international circuits in Japan, Macau and Belgium as well as Australia and New Zealand.

Jones started his racing career at the age of 14 doing motor cross racing from which he eventually progressed up to Formula Ford in 1980. He then spent a number of years occasionally driving a twin-turbo Chevrolet V8 powered Mercedes-Benz 450 SLC for Shepparton based racer Bryan Thompson. While driving for Thompson, Jones finished seventh in the 1985 Australian GT Championship driving the Mercedes and a Chevrolet Monza previously driven by Bob Jane, Peter Brock and Allan Grice (Thompson would win the championship also driving both cars, while Grice had won the championship in the Monza in 1984). Jones also proved himself as one of the stars of Series Production racing driving a Mitsubishi Starion Turbo during the early to mid-1980s, having many battles with production car "king" Peter Fitzgerald in another Starion, and former Bathurst winners Brian Sampson in yet another Starion, and Colin Bond in an Alfa Romeo GTV6.

In 1985 the Mitsubishi Ralliart Team invited him to race in the two major Australian endurance races, the 1985 Castrol 500 at Sandown, and the 1985 James Hardie 1000 in a factory Group A Mitsubishi Starion. Jones' first start in the Bathurst 1000 lasted only just past the first turn on the first lap. A mid-field mishap saw Jones' Starion and the Holden VK Commodore of 1981 race winner John French collide and spin off into the tyre barrier with both cars too damaged to continue. This relationship with the Ralliart team lasted on and off until the end of 1988, with Jones racing extensively in Japan and often being overlooked for Australian races. During this time he qualified the Starion in the top 10 at Bathurst for the 1986 James Hardie 1000, and finish 10th outright in 1988.

For 1989 Jones moved into the "big time", landing the drive as Peter Brock's teammate in the Mobil 1 Racing team driving an ex-Andy Rouse BTCC Ford Sierra RS500 in the 1989 Australian Touring Car Championship, though his series was cut short after Barry Sheene had wrecked Jones' car while testing at Winton. He would later qualify his car in the top 10 at the 1989 Tooheys 1000 and partnering Paul Radisich would finish the race in ninth position. In the 1990 the cost of running the expensive European based Sierra's forced Brock to join forces with Andrew Miedecke (whose own Sierra, like Brock's, had links to British Sierra expert Rouse), leaving Jones without a drive. From 1990–1994 he was then called upon to drive for the Factory Holden Racing Team in the endurance races. While he was with the factory team he was quite successful and gained many podiums at both Sandown and Bathurst paired with Neil Crompton (1990–91), Tomas Mezera (1992), Wayne Gardner (1993) and Craig Lowndes (1994).

Brad Jones' AUSCAR career started in 1988 in the third annual Goodyear AUSCAR 200 at the Calder Park Thunderdome, a track he would come to dominate, in a Holden VL Commodore dubbed the "Green Meanie" due to its colour. Jones quickly became a front runner in the series, eventually winning 5 consecutive championships in his self run team (with help from his brother Kim), Coopertools Racing (later with corporate Castrol sponsorship), all using Holden Commodore's. After dominating the AUSCAR's, Jones then turned his hands to the Australian NASCAR series and won the 94/95 championship driving a Chevrolet Lumina. Jones wasn't just dominant at the Thunderdome, he was also a regular winner on the ½ mile flat track Super Bowl at the Adelaide International Raceway (the only other paved oval in Australia), while his road racing background also saw him a winner on tracks like the Surfers Paradise Street Circuit and the short course at Oran Park.

In 1995 he switched from the Holden Racing Team to the Wayne Gardner owned Coca-Cola Team for whom he drove in both Sandown and Bathurst for 1995 and 1996 in a Holden VR Commodore. Once he lost the contract to drive with HRT he had to wait another year to get a contract to drive with Mark Larkham's Mitre 10 Ford Team. In the mid 1990s he also set up a highly successful Audi Super Touring team for the Australian Super Touring Championship, winning the championship in 1996 and 1998. He finished second with Frank Biela in an Audi A4 Quattro in the Super Touring 1997 AMP Bathurst 1000, while finishing third in 1998 with regular partner Cameron McConville.

He also won the 1994 Australian Super Production Car Series in a Lotus Esprit.

In 2000 the Jones brothers agreed that it would be a good decision to move to V8 Supercars full-time with their own team, the OzEmail Racing Team. In just the second year after the team was established, Jones and co-driver John Cleland finished second at the 2001 V8 Supercar 1000 at Bathurst after fighting Mark Skaife right to the end of the 1000 kilometre race with a gap at the end of only just over 2 seconds after a 6-hour race.

In 2000, Jones, thanks to his success in Super Touring with Audi, was also drafted into the Audi Sport North America team (run by Joest Racing) for the American Le Mans Series (ALMS) Race of a Thousand Years held on 31 December. This race was run on the Adelaide Street Circuit using the full Grand Prix version of the track rather than the shortened V8 Supercars version. Jones was on standby for lead driver Allan McNish who had injured his back stepping out of his Kilt after a pre-event photo shoot, and although Brad qualified the car, McNish recovered in time to take his place in the Audi R8 LMP, leaving Jones a spectator. McNish and his regular co-driver Rinaldo Capello won the race which also saw McNish crowned the inaugural ALMS Champion.

In 2002, Brad Jones Racing returned to the Mount Panorama Circuit with a two car team, Jones teamed up with John Bowe and led the race for the first 59 laps, setting the fastest ever race lap time in the history of the event at the time. In 2003 BJR didn't finish well but that took a turn in 2004 when the team took 3rd at the mountain.

In 2005 there was a change of team sponsor and the team was now called Team BOC. The team started on a high when Jones and Bowe placed first and second in the V8 Supercar support races at the Australian Grand Prix when they were the only team to choose dry slicks while the others took wet tyres in changing weather conditions. It then swiftly changed for the worse at Bathurst when Jones and the team could only manage 26th qualifying position and on race day were wiped out while charging through the field within the first 10 laps.

In 2006 there was new hope for Jones and the team as they had a new engine supplier, Stone Brothers Racing, and staff changes. But the SBR engine pack lacked reliability and power, which made the engine famous and the team struggled, especially after one of their codrivers (Mark Porter) was killed in an accident at the Bathurst 1000 km round. At the end of the season, long time driver John Bowe left the team and moved to Paul Cruickshank Racing. Jones' nephew, Andrew Jones joined the team after his two years at Garry Rogers Motorsport in 2005 and Tasman Motorsport in 2006.

Jones announced his retirement from full-time racing after the 2007 New Zealand round. His car was driven for the rest of the season by Simon Wills. Jones continues to appear in media roles regularly having taken on guest commentator roles with TV broadcasts over ten years ago, and co-hosted with Neil Crompton, which was hosted by internet provider Telstra Bigpond as part of their V8 Supercar package until it was axed at the end of 2008. Jones continued to drive for his team in an endurance co-driver role, finishing fifth in the 2008 Bathurst 1000. After running as high a third in the 2009 Bathurst 1000 and a career spanning 109 ATCC/V8s races spanning 24 seasons, Jones retired from competitive racing.

Career results
Results sourced from Driver Database.

Complete World Sportscar Championship results
(key) (Races in bold indicate pole position) (Races in italics indicate fastest lap)

† Not eligible for series points

Complete World Touring Car Championship results
(key) (Races in bold indicate pole position) (Races in italics indicate fastest lap)

† Not eligible for series points

Complete Asia-Pacific Touring Car Championship results
(key) (Races in bold indicate pole position) (Races in italics indicate fastest lap)

Complete American Le Mans Series results
(key) (Races in bold indicate pole position) (Races in italics indicate fastest lap)

* Jones qualified the race winning #77 Audi R8 in Adelaide (Rinaldo Capello set the pole time) but he did not drive in the race.

Complete Bathurst 1000 results

* Super Touring races

Complete Bathurst 24 Hour results

References

External links
Brad Jones Racing

1960 births
Australian Touring Car Championship drivers
Living people
Motorsport announcers
Sportspeople from Albury
Racing drivers from New South Wales
Supercars Championship drivers
Australian Endurance Championship drivers
Audi Sport drivers